A party-list system is a type of electoral system that formally involves political parties in the electoral process, usually to facilitate multi-winner elections. In party-list systems, parties put forward a list of candidates, the party-list who stand for election on one ticket. Voters can usually vote directly for the party-list, but in other systems voters may vote for directly individuals candidates within or across party lists (such systems are referred to as open list and panachage), besides or instead of voting directly for parties (mixed electoral systems).

Most commonly, party-list systems refer to party-list proportional representation, but there are other electoral systems using party-lists including the general ticket (party block voting) and mixed electoral systems.  Not only are not all party-list systems proportional, not all proportional systems are party-list systems. Candidates who won their seats from a party-list are called list MPs.

Types party-list systems

By proportionality of representation 

 proportional party-list systems, including list PR and MMP
 semi-proportional party-list systems, including parallel voting and AMS
 plurality/majoritarian party-list system (general ticket)

By candidate selection 

 Open-list
 Closed-list
 Local list
 Two-tier party-list systems
 Ley de Lemas

By ballot type 

 single vote
 mixed ballot
 panachage
 double simultaneous vote

Other 

 mixed electoral systems that use party-list PR to allocate some, but not all seats

See also 

 Election
 List of electoral systems by country
 Comparison of electoral systems
 Outline of democracy
 Multi-member district
 Single transferable vote
 Party-list proportional representation

References 

Electoral systems